Elections to Wyre Borough Council were held on 5 May 2011, along with the 2011 United Kingdom Alternative Vote referendum. All 55 councillors were elected from 26 wards in elections held every four years. The Conservative Party stayed in overall control of the council.

The Local Government Boundary Commission for England reviewed the electoral wards of Wyre Borough Council in 2014 with the new electoral map to be elected for the first time at the 2015 Wyre Borough Council election.

Following the election, the composition of the council is now as follows:

Election result

Ward results

Bourne

Breck

Brock

Cabus

Calder

Carleton

Catterall

Cleveleys Park

Garstang

Great Eccleston

Hambleton & Stalmine-with-Staynall

Hardhorn

Highcross

Jubilee

Mount

Norcross

Park

Pharos

Pilling

Preesall

Rossall

Staina

Tithebarn

Victoria

Warren

Wyresdale

References

External links
Wyre Council

2011 English local elections
2011
2010s in Lancashire